Hypophthalmichthys is a genus of large cyprinid fish consisting of three species. The name comes from Greek ὑπό, (hypó) "below"; ὀφθαλμός (ophthalmós), "eye"; ἰχθῦς (ichthŷs), "fish", thus "fish with eyes below", referring to the fact that the fish has its eyes below the mouth line. Members of this genus are native to fresh water in East Asia, ranging from Siberia to Vietnam, but have been widely introduced outside their native range, where often considered invasive.

The genus is also known as bighead carp, though that term is also used for individual species, particularly Hypophthalmichthys nobilis. The Russian language has a special word for the genus - tolstolób (literally thickforehead).

Species 
The three currently recognized species in the genus are:
 H. harmandi Sauvage, 1884 (largescale silver carp)
 H. molitrix (Valenciennes, 1844) (silver carp)
 H. nobilis (J. Richardson, 1845) (bighead carp)

References 

 
Cyprinid fish of Asia
Cyprinidae genera
Carp